Eslamabad (also Romanized as Eslāmābād; also known as Eslāmābād-e Shāh Neshīn and Shāh Neshīn) is a village in Rud Zard Rural District, in the Central District of Bagh-e Malek County, Khuzestan Province, Iran. At the 2006 census, its population was 42, in 10 families.

References 

Populated places in Bagh-e Malek County